Kathleen Ann Shower (born March 8, 1953 as Kathleen Ann Schrauer) is an American model and actress. Known as Kathy Shower she is Playboy's Playmate of the Month for May 1985 and Playmate of the Year for 1986. At that time, she was the oldest woman ever to appear as a Playboy Playmate, at age 33, as well as a single mother of two.

Career 
As many Playboy models do, Shower went on to appear in a string of Playboy videos.

Before and after Playboy, Shower had an acting career mainly within the action-adventure (American Kickboxer 2, The Further Adventures of Tennessee Buck) & erotic thriller genres (Boundaries, LA Goddess and Velvet Dreams). Shower also made numerous appearances on mainstream TV, guest-starring in episodes of Knight Rider, Three's Company, Simon & Simon and a forty-six episode continuing role in the daytime drama series Santa Barbara. In 2009, Shower completed an independent film entitled Kathy Shower: Playmate Model Mom.

Shower worked as a model for the Tapout clothing company.

At age 43, she was again featured in Playboy in a "Playmates Revisited" pictorial in August 1996.

Personal life 
Shower was born in Brookville, Ohio.

Partial filmography 
 1993 American Kickboxer 2 as Lillian
 1993 L.A. Goddess as Lisa Moore
 1987 The Further Adventures of Tennessee Buck as Barbara Manchester
 1985–1986 Santa Barbara as Janice Harrison
 1985–1986 Knight Rider as Claudia Torrell / Tori
 1984 Simon & Simon as Unknown
 1984 The New Mike Hammer as Unknown
 1983 CHiPs as Cindy / Honey Jean
 1982 Three's Company as Millicent

References

External links 

 
 

1953 births
Living people
American film actresses
1980s Playboy Playmates
Playboy Playmates of the Year
People from Brookville, Ohio
American soap opera actresses
American television actresses
Actresses from Ohio
20th-century American actresses
21st-century American women